Geis is a German . Notable people with the surname include:

Bernard J. Geis (1909–2001), American editor and publisher
Gemma Geis (born 1979), Catalan politician
George J. Geis, American Baptist minister and anthropologist
Gerald Geis (1933-2022), American politician
Gilbert Geis (1925–2012), American criminologist
Irving Geis (1908–1997), American artist
Jacob Geis (1890–1972), German theatre director, screenwriter and film producer
Johannes Geis (born 1993), German footballer
Norbert Geis (born 1939), German politician
Paul Geis (born 1953), Olympic athlete 
Richard E. Geis (1927–2013), American science fiction fan and writer

See also
 , in Irish, an idiosyncratic taboo, whether of obligation or prohibition, similar to being under a vow, with the plural having mystical connotations
 
 Geist (disambiguation)

German-language surnames